The Aberdeen Angus, sometimes simply Angus, is a Scottish breed of small beef cattle. It derives from cattle native to the counties of Aberdeen, Banff, Kincardine and Angus in north-eastern Scotland. In 2018 the breed accounted for over 17% of the UK beef industry.

The Angus is naturally polled and solid black or red, although the udder may be white. The cattle have been exported to many countries of the world; there are large populations in Australia, Canada, New Zealand, South America and the United States, where it has developed into two separate and distinct breeds, the American Angus and Red Angus. In some countries it has been bred to be taller than the native Scottish stock.

Its conservation status worldwide is "not at risk"; in the United Kingdom the original Native Aberdeen Angus – cattle not influenced by cross-breeding with imported stock – is listed by the Rare Breeds Survival Trust as "at risk".

History 

Aberdeen Angus cattle have been recorded in north-eastern Scotland since at least the sixteenth century. For some time before the 1800s, the hornless cattle in Angus were called "Angus Doddies", while those in the historic province of Buchan (later part of Aberdeenshire) were known as "Buchan Humlies", both "doddie" and "humlie" meaning polled.

In 1824, William McCombie of Tillyfour, later the Member of Parliament for West Aberdeenshire, began to improve the stock and is regarded today as the father of the breed.

The breed was officially recognised in 1835, and was initially registered together with the Galloway in the Polled Herd Book. A society was formed in 1879. The cattle became commonplace throughout the British Isles in the middle of the twentieth century.

Argentina
As stated in the fourth volume of the Herd Book of the UK's Angus, this breed was introduced to Argentina in 1879 when "Don Carlos Guerrero" imported one bull and two cows for his Estancia "Charles" located in Juancho, Partido de General Madariaga, Provincia de Buenos Aires. The bull was born on 19 April 1878; named "Virtuoso 1626" and raised by Colonel Ferguson. The cows were named "Aunt Lee 4697" raised by J. James and "Cinderela 4968" raised by R. Walker and were both born in 1878, on 31 January and 23 April respectively.

Australia
Angus cattle were first introduced to Van Diemen's Land (now Tasmania) in the 1820s, and to the southern mainland in 1840. The breed is now found in all Australian states and territories with 62,000 calves registered with Angus Australia in 2010.

Canada
In 1876 William Brown, a professor of agriculture and then superintendent of the experimental farm at Guelph, Ontario, was granted permission by the government of Ontario to purchase Aberdeen Angus cattle for the Ontario Agricultural College. The herd comprised a yearling bull, Gladiolus, and a cow, Eyebright, bred by the Earl of Fife and a cow, Leochel Lass 4th, bred by R.O. Farquharson. On 12 January 1877, Eyebright gave birth to a calf, sired by Sir Wilfrid. It was the first to be born outside of Scotland. The OAC went on to import additional bulls and cows, eventually began selling Aberdeen Angus cattle in 1881.

United States
On 17 May 1873, George Grant brought four Angus bulls, without any cows, to Victoria, Kansas. These were seen as unusual as the normal American cattle consisted of Shorthorns and Longhorns, and the bulls were used only in crossbreeding. However, the farmers noticed the good qualities of these bulls and afterwards, many more cattle of both sexes were imported.

On 21 November 1883, the American Angus Association was founded in Chicago, Illinois. The first herd book was published on March 1885. At this time both red and black animals were registered without distinction. However, in 1917 the Association barred the registering of red and other coloured animals in an effort to promote a solid black breed.

The Red Angus Association of America was founded in 1954 by breeders of Red Angus cattle. It was formed because the breeders had had their cattle struck off the herd book for not conforming to the changed breed standard regarding colour.

Germany
A separate breed was cross bred in Germany called the German Angus. It is a cross between the Angus and several different cattle such as the German Black Pied Cattle, Gelbvieh, and Fleckvieh. The cattle are usually larger than the Angus and appear in black and red colours.

Characteristics 
Because of their native environment, the cattle are very hardy and can survive the Scottish winters, which are typically harsh, with snowfall and storms. Cows typically weigh  and bulls weigh . Calves are usually born smaller than is acceptable for the market, so crossbreeding with dairy cattle is needed for veal production. The cattle are naturally polled and black in colour. They typically mature earlier than other native British breeds such as the Hereford or North Devon. However, in the middle of the 20th century a new strain of cattle called the Red Angus emerged. The United States does not accept Red Angus cattle into herd books, while the UK and Canada do. Except for their colour genes, there is no genetic difference between black and red Angus, but they are regarded as different breeds in the US. However, there have been claims that black angus are more sustainable to cold weather, though unconfirmed.

The cattle have a large muscle content and are regarded as medium-sized. The meat is very popular in Japan for its marbling qualities.

Genetic disorders
There are four recessive defects that can affect calves worldwide. A recessive defect occurs when both parents carry a recessive gene that will affect the calf. One in four calves will show the defect even when both parents carry the defective gene. The four recessive defects in the Black Angus breed that are currently managed with DNA tests are arthrogryposis multiplex (AM), referred to as curly calf, which lowers the mobility of joints; neuropathic hydrocephalus (NH), sometimes known as water head, which causes an enlarged malformed skull; contractural arachnodactyly (CA), formerly referred to by the name of "fawn calf syndrome", which reduces mobility in the hips; and dwarfism, which affects the size of calves. Both parents need to carry the genes for a calf to be affected with one of these disorders.
Because of this, the American Angus Association will remove the carrier cattle from the breed in an effort to reduce the number of cases.

Between 2008 and 2010, the American Angus Association reported worldwide recessive genetic disorders in Angus cattle. It has been shown that a small minority of Angus cattle can carry osteoporosis. A further defect called notomelia, a form of polymelia ("many legs") was reported in the Angus breed in 2010.

Uses
The main use of Angus cattle is for beef production and consumption. The beef can be marketed as superior due to its marbled appearance. This has led to many markets, including Australia, Japan and the United Kingdom to adopt it into the mainstream. Angus cattle can also be used in crossbreeding to reduce the likelihood of dystocia (difficult calving), and because of their dominant polled gene, they can be used to crossbreed to create polled calves.

See also
 List of cattle breeds originating in Scotland

References 

Beef cattle breeds
Cattle breeds
Cattle breeds originating in Scotland
Red cattle